Ahora (est. 1962) is a Cuban newspaper located in Holguín. It is published in Spanish. It has been released weekly on a Saturday since January 1992.

Its editor is Yanisleidys Martínez Peña and its deputy editor Claudia Arias Espinosa.

References

External links
 Ahora online 

Mass media in Holguín
Newspapers published in Cuba
Spanish-language newspapers
1962 establishments in Cuba